Euptera liberti is a butterfly in the family Nymphalidae. It is found in Cameroon (south of Yaoundé) and the north-eastern part of the Democratic Republic of the Congo.

The larvae feed on Tetrapleura thoningii.

References

Butterflies described in 1987
Euptera